{{Speciesbox
| name = Lady of the night
| image = Brassavola nodosa Orchi 03.jpg
| genus = Brassavola
| species = nodosa
| authority = (L.) Lindl.
| synonyms_ref = 
| synonyms =
Epidendrum nodosum L. (1753) (Basionym)Cymbidium nodosum (L.) Sw. (1799)Bletia nodosa (L.) Rchb.f. (1862)Brassavola rhopalorrhachis Rchb.f. (1852)Bletia rhopalorrhachis (Rchb.f.) Rchb.f. (1862)Brassavola nodosa var. rhopalorrhachis  Schltr. (1919)Brassavola scaposa Schltr. (1919)
}}Brassavola nodosa is a small, tough species of orchid native to Mexico (from Tamaulipas south to Chiapas and the Yucatán Peninsula), Central America, the West Indies, and northern South America (Venezuela, Colombia, Guyana and French Guiana).Hágsater, E. & G. A. Salazar. 1990. Orchids of Mexico, pt. 1. Icones Orchidacearum (Mexico) 1: plates 1–100. Asociación Mexicana de Orquideología, México, D.F. It is also known as "lady of the night" orchid due to its citrus and gardenia-like fragrance which begins in the early evening.  It has been widely hybridized and cultivated for its showy flowers and pleasing scent.

ScentBrassavola nodosa is known for its exceptionally strong fragrance, which is emitted primarily after dark to attract night-pollinating moths.  As is typical for moth-pollinated flowers, the scent of B. nodosa is described as "white floral".  It is dominated by linalool, benzoates, salicylates, and nerolidol.

Genetics
The diploid chromosome number of B. nodosa'' has been determined to be 2n = 40

References

External links

nodosa
Plants described in 1753
Taxa named by Carl Linnaeus
Orchids of Belize
Orchids of Mexico
Orchids of Colombia
Orchids of Venezuela
Orchids of Central America
Orchids of Guyana
Flora of the Caribbean
Flora without expected TNC conservation status